= Misses Kisses =

American lingerie retailer

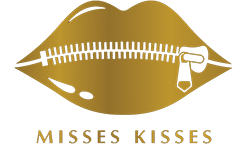
- Company type: Clothing
- Industry: Lingerie
- Founded: 2016
- Headquarters: California, USA
- Products: Lingerie
- Website: misseskisses.com

Misses Kisses is an American lingerie retailer known for its creation and marketing of a “Frontless Backless Strapless Bra.” Founded in 2016 by Amanda Marie, Misses Kisses is a female-owned and operated business operating out of California and through its website. Misses Kisses is the owner of U.S. Patent No. 10,058,132 (the “’132 Patent”), entitled “Cleavage Enhancing Undergarment System. The Misses Kisses bra is not a traditional bra but nonetheless serves the same function.
